is a former Japanese football player. His elder brother Takuma is also a former footballer.

Playing career
Koga was born in Shizuoka on May 22, 1970. After graduating from Hosei University, he joined Yokohama Marinos in 1993. He debuted in 1995 and he played many matches offensive midfielder. The club also won the champions 1995 J1 League. However he could hardly play in the match in 1996 and he moved to Japan Football League club Sagan Tosu in 1997. He became a regular player and the club was promoted to J2 League in 1999. In 2001, he moved to Regional Leagues club Sagawa Express Chukyo. He retired end of 2006 season.

Club statistics

References

External links

sagan-kizuna.com

1970 births
Living people
Hosei University alumni
Association football people from Shizuoka Prefecture
Japanese footballers
J1 League players
J2 League players
Japan Football League (1992–1998) players
Yokohama F. Marinos players
Sagan Tosu players
Association football midfielders